Jahorina Ski Resort, officially named Olympic Center Jahorina, is a mountain resort and the largest and most popular winter tourism resort in Bosnia and Herzegovina. The ski resort is situated on the slopes of Jahorina mountain in Dinaric Alps. The Jahorina ski resort hosted alpine skiing competition during the 1984 Winter Olympics.

History
The first written documents recorded skiing on Jahorina mountain in the late 19th century during the Austro-Hungarian rule.  The origins of organized tourism on Jahorina trace back to 1923, founding year of the ski resort. Between the First and the Second World War, ski jumps and a mountain lodge were constructed at Jahorina. The first Yugoslav ski rally was held at Jahorina in 1937. 

After World War II, Jahorina hosted the "International Students Winter Week" in 1955, a forerunner to the Winter Universiade that would start five years later in Chamonix, France.

The Jahorina ski resort was the site of the Women's Alpine Winter Olympic competitions during the 1984 Winter Olympics, that took place from 8–19 February 1984 in Sarajevo, SFR Yugoslavia. Starting from 1984, Jahorina ski resort bares the official name "Olympic Center Jahorina".

Since the 2010s, the Jahorina ski resort went thorough several investment cycles with aim to renew its aging infrastructure. The ski lift system was upgraded from 2012 to 2018 with  new Leitner chairlifts.

During 2017, the brand new snowmaking infrastructure was deployed in ski resort, along with huge artificial lake built on top of Jahorina mountain. In December 2018, the Jahorina ski resort has officially put the new snowmaking system in use, covering all ski slopes with artificial snow.

As of 2018, the Jahorina ski resort is the largest and most popular ski resort in Bosnia and Herzegovina. Apart from alpine skiing, snowboarding, hiking and sledding, it offers a variety of outdoor sports and activities. The nordic skiing tracks, cross-country trails and various other sport facilities offer additional options for athletes and tourists. The floodlighting system enables night skiing on Poljice ski piste. In 2018, the ski resort recorded 185,000 visitors, the biggest count since the 1980s.

The Jahorina ski resort was among the venues where the 2019 European Youth Olympic Winter Festival took place during February 2019.

Climate and Geography
Day count under the snow in Jahorina ski resort is on average 175 days annually, spanning from October till May. High levels of natural snowfall are complemented by snowmaking equipment.

Transportation
The ski resort is reached by maximum of six hour drive from all major cities in the region: Belgrade, Zagreb, Novi Sad, Split, Podgorica and Ljubljana.

Gallery

See also
 Tourism in Bosnia and Herzegovina

References

External links

 
 Ski resort Jahorina at skiresort.info

Venues of the 1984 Winter Olympics
Olympic alpine skiing venues
Ski areas and resorts in Bosnia and Herzegovina
Dinaric Alps